Be I Strong is Jamaican reggae singer Sizzla's seventh studio album. It was released on VP Records on November 2, 1999. All songs were written by Sizzla, except for the collaboration with Capleton on "The Vibes". The record was produced by Philip "Fatis" Burrell.

Track listing
"Men & People"
"Love Is All"
"Diamond & Pearl"
"Bless Bless"
"Stop the Youth"
"Live & Learn"
"Mi King"
"Be I Strong"
"The Vibes" (featuring Capleton)
"Get Lively"
"No Chance"
"Live Longer"
"Powerful"
"Nah Suffer"
"Stop Violate"
"Keep Out a Bad Company"

Personnel
 Winston Bowen - guitar
 Philip "Fatis" Burrell - producer
 Joel Chin - mastering
 Paul Daley - engineer
 Donald Dennis - bass guitar, guitar, piano, drums, keyboards
 Sly Dunbar - drums
 Dean Fraser - saxophone
 Solgie Hamilton - mixing
 Paul "Jazzwad" Yebuah - bass guitar, piano, drums
 Robert Lyn - piano
 Malachi - drums
 Julien "Frenchie" Massonnet - artwork
 Christopher Meredith - bass guitar, keyboards
 George "Dusty" Miller - drums
 Mr. Chung - artwork
 Ronald "Nambo" Robinson - trombone
 Paul Shields - mastering
 Skoolaz - engineer
 Earl "Chinna" Smith - guitar
 Stephen Stanley - keyboards, mixing

References

External links
 [ Review] at Allmusic
 Sizzla's website
 VP Records

1999 albums
Sizzla albums